Reza Fazeli (3 July 1935, Tehran - 13 April 2009, California), Iranian actor, film director and leading opposition figure.

After a period of one year in the Imperial Iranian Air Force he left the country in 1953. In the following years he was in the area of the Persian Gulf as well as in Lebanon and Egypt and finally passed eight years in France, Germany, Great Britain and the United States of America. After years of education and work he returned to Persia. Reza Fazeli made a career as an actor and film director in Iranian cinema and in international productions.

After the Islamic Revolution he left Iran and founded "KVC", a company where he produced political documentaries against the new government in Iran.

From 2002 through 2005 he worked in AZADI TV ("Freedom TV"), a political broadcasting service based in the United States and working against the clerical government in Iran. Later, he continued his political activities in another Persian TV channel, Pars TV.

Filmography 
 Mashti Mamdali's Car (1974) - director

References

External links 
 

1935 births
2009 deaths
Critics of Islam
Iranian atheists
Iranian memoirists
People from Tehran
Iranian male actors
Iranian male writers
Iranian screenwriters
Iranian former Muslims
Iranian film directors
Iranian male film actors
Iranian emigrants to the United States
Iranian expatriates in the United Kingdom